The Land (translit. Al-Ard) is a 1969 Egyptian drama film directed by Youssef Chahine, based on a popular novel by Abdel Rahman al-Sharqawi. The film narrates the conflict between peasants and their landlord in rural Egypt in the 1930s, and explores the complex relation between individual interests and collective responses to oppression. It was entered into the 1970 Cannes Film Festival.
<|ref

Cast

 Mahmoud El-Meliguy as Mohamed Abu Swelam
 Yehia Chahine as Hassuna
 Ezzat El Alaili as Abd El-Hadi
 Hamdy Ahmed as Mohammad Effendi
 Tewfik El Dekn as Khedr
 Salah El-Saadany as Elwani
 Ali El Scherif as Diab
 Nagwa Ibrahim as Wassifa

References

External links

1969 films
1969 drama films
Egyptian drama films
1960s Arabic-language films
Films directed by Youssef Chahine
Films about landlords
Films about farmers